Nodubothea zapoteca is a species of beetle in the family Cerambycidae. It was described by Monne and Monne in 2008. It is known from Mexico.

References

Colobotheini
Beetles described in 2008